The Longest Night is a 1972 American made-for-television drama film written by Merwin Gerard and directed by Jack Smight. This movie was originally shown as an ABC Movie of the Week on September 12, 1972. It is based on the 1968 Barbara Mackle kidnapping by Gary Steven Krist.

Plot
The plot concerns the kidnapping of Karen Chambers, daughter of wealthy Alan Chambers. The kidnapper holds her underground in a homemade coffin. He leaves her there, with a fan for air and a gallon of water, until he receives the ransom money. Her family frantically searches for her.

Cast
 David Janssen as Alan Chambers
 James Farentino as John Danbury
 Phyllis Thaxter as Norma Chambers
 Skye Aubrey as Ellen Gunther
 Mike Farrell as Wills
 Sallie Shockley as Karen Chambers
 Joel Fabiani as Barris
 Richard Anderson as Harvey Eaton
 Charles McGraw as Father Chase
 John Kerr as Agent Jones
 Robert Cornthwaite as Frank Cavanaugh
 Ross Elliott as Dr. Steven Clay
 Tom Hallick as Officer Clark
 Antony Carbone as Officer Jackson
 Joe Conley as Salesman

Production
Filming started June 1972 at Universal studios.

Legacy
The film inspired a story Quentin Tarantino created for CSI: Crime Scene Investigation, which the show's house writers scripted into an episode he directed in 2005 titled Grave Danger, a two-hour season finale in which the Las Vegas crime team had to rescue a colleague who has been buried alive.

References

External links
 
 
 

1972 television films
1972 films
1972 drama films
American drama films
ABC Movie of the Week
Drama films based on actual events
Films about kidnapping
Films directed by Jack Smight
1970s American films